Libidibia monosperma is a species of legume in the family Fabaceae, with the common names cóbana negra and cóbana polisandro. It is found in the Dominican Republic, Puerto Rico, and the United States Virgin Islands. It is a federally listed threatened species of the United States.

References

External links
Stahlia monosperma. Center for Plant Conservation.
 

Caesalpinieae
Trees of the Dominican Republic
Trees of Puerto Rico
Flora of the United States Virgin Islands
Taxonomy articles created by Polbot
Taxobox binomials not recognized by IUCN